Lenda Belly Vumbi Bundu (born 13 July 1995) is a French footballer who currently plays for Swiss club Stade Nyonnais.

Career
Vumbi  is a youth exponent from Tours FC. He plays as left back. He made his Ligue 2 debut on the opening game of the 2013–14 season on 2 August 2013 against Clermont Foot replacing Billy Ketkeophomphone after 68 minutes in a 2–1 away loss. Four days later, he played in the Coupe de la Ligue against Istres.

In August 2019, Vumbi joined Swiss club Yverdon-Sport FC.

References

External links
 
 

1995 births
Living people
Sportspeople from Aubervilliers
French people of Angolan descent
Association football fullbacks
French footballers
Tours FC players
Académico de Viseu F.C. players
Leixões S.C. players
R.E. Virton players
Yverdon-Sport FC players
FC Stade Lausanne Ouchy players
Ligue 2 players
Championnat National 3 players
Liga Portugal 2 players
Campeonato de Portugal (league) players
Belgian Pro League players
Swiss Promotion League players
France youth international footballers
French expatriate footballers
French expatriate sportspeople in Portugal
Expatriate footballers in Portugal
French expatriate sportspeople in Belgium
Expatriate footballers in Belgium
French expatriate sportspeople in Switzerland
Expatriate footballers in Switzerland
FC Stade Nyonnais players
Footballers from Seine-Saint-Denis